Beeston and Holbeck is a ward in the metropolitan borough of the City of Leeds, West Yorkshire, England.  It contains 24 listed buildings that are recorded in the National Heritage List for England.  Of these, two are listed at Grade II*, the middle of the three grades, and the others are at Grade II, the lowest grade.  The ward is to the south of the centre of Leeds,  it contains the areas of Beeston and Holbeck, and is largely residential.  Most of the listed buildings are houses and associated structures.  In the ward is Holbeck Cemetery, which contains listed buildings including a memorial.  The other listed buildings include a farm building, churches and associated structures, churches later used for other purposes, former schools and associated structures, a railway viaduct, a railway underbridge, and a public house.


Key

Buildings

References

Citations

Sources

 

Lists of listed buildings in West Yorkshire